The Roosevelt House Public Policy Institute at Hunter College (Roosevelt House) is a think tank affiliated with Hunter College.  It is located at 47-49 East 65th Street in the Lenox Hill neighborhood of Manhattan's Upper East Side in New York City.  It is dedicated to analyzing public policy and fostering civic engagement by educating students in public policy and human rights, supporting faculty research, and supporting scholarly and public lectures, seminars, and conferences.

Key residents 

The institute is housed in the historic Sara Delano Roosevelt Memorial House and honors the legacy of Franklin and Eleanor Roosevelt.  Sara Delano Roosevelt, Franklin Roosevelt’s mother, promised to buy a new home for him and his wife, Eleanor.  In December 1908, the family moved into the building which still stands:  Franklin, Eleanor, and their children, James and Anna, into No. 49; Sara Delano Roosevelt, into No. 47.  This is where Franklin Roosevelt “began his storied political career, rising from New York State Senator and U.S. Assistant Secretary of the Navy to Governor of New York and President of the United States”. Franklin D. Roosevelt was the only president “elected to four consecutive terms of office”.  He is often “ranked with George Washington and Abraham Lincoln as one of the greatest U.S. presidents”.  His wife, Eleanor Roosevelt, also made her way into politics from Roosevelt House:  she led movements for human rights and was a key figure in some feminist movements, fighting for women’s rights.  Over the course of 24 years, many events which made both Franklin and Eleanor Roosevelt popular amongst the American people took place in Roosevelt House.

Political events 
Much happened at the Roosevelt House, both professionally as well as personally. As a New York State Senator, Roosevelt believed that the government “had to play a role in creating and maintaining a fair and equitable society, and in protecting individuals from concentrations of economic or political power”. He had been re-elected to the New York State Senate when President Woodrow Wilson asked him to be a part of his administration. To this end, FDR became the Assistant Secretary of the Navy. President Roosevelt was very active in this role.

As Governor of New York, FDR knew he was one step closer to running for president. As the Great Depression approached, Franklin Roosevelt was able to get the New York state legislature to “pass a public works program for the unemployed and to grant relief to the needy”. President Herbert Hoover, the president at the time, did not pursue similar policies federally. Running on the New Deal platform of policies similar to those he'd supported in New York, Roosevelt was able to defeat Hoover in the 1932 presidential election.

President Roosevelt became president at a time of tremendous economic crisis. In response to this catastrophe, which was affecting millions of citizens, Franklin Roosevelt established a "series of programs" in 1933, known as the New Deal. The goal was to "restore the economy to a healthy level, and reform the financial system in order to prevent future fiscal catastrophes." The first program under the New Deal was to build the nation's trust regarding the American banking system. During this time, most Americans kept their money at home, simply because they didn't trust the banks. So, President Roosevelt called for Congress to pass the Emergency Banking Act. The purpose of this act was to "require the Treasury Department to inspect all banks before they could reopen." After the reopening of the banks, citizens redeposited their money. Attention was then paid to farms. In 1933, the Agricultural Adjustment Act was passed, which was soon "overturned by the Supreme Court." This act was replaced by the Soil Conservation and Domestic Allotment Act. The act enacted the "government's ability to pay farms to reduce production." One of the most important pieces of legislation passed in American history was the Social Security Act. Under this act, poor senior citizens were given "$15 a month," and pension was also provided. In addition, the act "set up an unemployment insurance system and provided aid to disabled people and dependent children." FDR developed legislative programs that focused on disabled people partly given his own paralysis from polio.

Personal life: growing apart 
Although we know that much has happened at the Roosevelt House professionally and politically, a lot happened behind the scenes in the Roosevelts’ personal lives as well. As Eleanor Roosevelt had more kids, she and her husband were found to be spending less time together. In 1918, she found out about President Roosevelt’s affair with the secretary, Lucy Mercer. She “offered FDR a divorce, but FDR turned down her offer”. He turned down her offer because he felt as a divorcé, he wouldn’t be able to go far in politics. It was after this when she realized that she should have a life of her own, and become independent. She became involved in “a number of political organizations, including the League of Women Voters and the Women's Trade Union League”. She sought out to resolve issues regarding “equal pay for equal work”, which is something we as a nation are still struggling with today.

As mentioned earlier, in 1921, President Roosevelt was diagnosed with polio. Eleanor took care of him and motivated him to stay in the public eye. Despite this, both individuals were growing further apart. Eleanor and Franklin were involved in different social circles and had different interests. Although everyone considered the couple to be leading a perfect life together, it was quite the opposite. Eleanor “became financially independent” by publicly speaking at events and appearing in “magazine articles”. In 1928, Roosevelt was elected governor of New York. Eleanor, one of the leading Democrats at the time, was largely involved in Franklin Roosevelt’s decision making and other activities. During the time of Roosevelt’s governorship, she also taught at the Todhunter School. Especially during the time of the Great Depression, Eleanor motivated women to work outside of the home. She considered the occupation of a home-maker to be “out of date”. She strived to provide “economic security for working women”. When Franklin Roosevelt was elected president in 1932, Eleanor became romantically linked with an Associated Press reporter, Lorena Hickok.

Political importance 
This site is important to American politics because of the historical decisions that President Roosevelt and Eleanor Roosevelt made during their time at the Roosevelt House. The efforts which both husband and wife made for the nation paid off, to say the least. Even after being elected as president, Franklin Roosevelt set up his administration at the Roosevelt House. It was also at Roosevelt House where he offered positions to individuals, including Frances Perkins, the “first female to serve as a Cabinet Secretary.” Before his inauguration in March 1933, Franklin Roosevelt held meetings here to discuss what was to be done within the First Hundred Days. The early New Deal was also discussed during these meetings. President Roosevelt's mother, Sara, “hosted Mary McLeod Bethune, a key African-American leader, who later served as the head of FDR’s informal ‘Black Cabinet’ during the New Deal”. This illustrates that she was very open towards people of different races and faiths. Additionally, on November 9, 1932, the day after the presidential election, President Roosevelt spoke from the Roosevelt House. This was his “first radio address to the American people as president-elect”. This historical site is also important because this is where President Roosevelt mustered the courage to be strong-willed and hopeful, after polio left him physically unable to move.

Roosevelts' relationship with Hunter College 
The Roosevelts’ relationship with Hunter College was unique. Eleanor used to “walk over to visit students and speak at special events”. In 1941, when Sara Delano passed away, President Roosevelt put the property up for sale. However, a “nonprofit consortium” was willing to purchase it on behalf of the College. To make the property more affordable, President Roosevelt lowered the buying price. Additionally, he donated money for students to buy books.

Present day 
Restoration work on the Roosevelt House started in 2005, and was done by 2010. The Roosevelt House was being repaired while preserving “the historically significant floor-plan of the first through fourth floors”. The historical site still retains its political beauty. Although it used to be called home to our former President, it’s now home to many human rights, public policy, and political science students at Hunter. Panels and social events are often held here. A small collection of Roosevelt family memorabilia is on view in Franklin D. Roosevelt’s historic library, located on the second floor of the house. Two apartments are used to house visiting scholars and in the rear is a large room that can be used as an auditorium.

Academic programs and scholarships 
Roosevelt House offers two minor and certificate academic programs, in human rights and public policy, and sponsors the Hunter College Roosevelt House Scholarship.

Roosevelt House Faculty Associates are appointed from the Hunter College faculty for a renewable three-year term.

References

External links 
 video, 26:51
 https://www.youtube.com/user/HunterCollegeRH
 http://www.roosevelthouse.hunter.cuny.edu/

Hunter College
Think tanks established in 2010
Think tanks based in the United States
Monuments and memorials to Franklin D. Roosevelt in the United States
City University of New York research institutes
2010 establishments in New York City